Madrasa Al Habibia Al Kubra (arabe : المدرسة الحبيبية الكبرى) is one of the madrasas of Tunis.

Location 
It is located in 49, Abdel Wahab Street, near the Maâkal Az-Zaïm Square.

History 
This school was built in 1926 by Muhammad VI al-Habib. It is the biggest madrasa in Tunis since it can accommodate 98 students and has 30 rooms.

References 

Habibia Al Kubra